Olszeski Town (previously also known as Mount Pleasant) is an unincorporated community in Mount Pleasant Township, Jefferson County, Ohio, United States.

References

Unincorporated communities in Jefferson County, Ohio